The Paiute sculpin (Cottus beldingii) is a species of fish in the family Cottidae. It is found in the United States,  inhabiting the Columbia River drainage from Idaho, western Wyoming, and northeastern Nevada to western Washington and Oregon, and endorheic basins including Lake Tahoe in Nevada and California. It reaches a maximum length of 13.0 cm. It prefers rubble and gravel riffles of cold creeks and small to medium rivers. It is also found in rocky shores of lakes.

References

Cottus (fish)
Fish described in 1891
Taxa named by Carl H. Eigenmann
Taxa named by Rosa Smith Eigenmann